Huangtong Subdistrict is an urban subdistrict in Puding County, Guizhou, China.

History
According to the result on adjustment of township-level administrative divisions of Puding County on January 29, 2016, Chengguan Town was revoked and Huangtong Subdistrict was established.

Administrative division
, the subdistrict administers 8 villages and 4 residential communities: Houzhai Village, Doupeng Village, Xinbu Village, Chenqi Village, Heliu Village, Tianba Village, Zhenyuan Village, Daxing Village, Qingshan Community, Guanfeng Community, Taipingbu Community, and Taiping Community.

Geography
Mountains located adjacent to and visible from the townsite are: Mount Guanyin, Mount Tuan, Mount Jian, Mount Miaozhai.

Qingshan Reservoir is the largest body of water in the subdistrict.

Transportation
Huangtong railway station and Puding railway station serve the subdistrict. 

The Anshun-Liupanshui railway is under construction.

The County Road X434 passes across the subdistrict north to south.

References

Divisions of Puding County
Subdistricts of Guizhou